Hyblaea firmamentum is a moth in the family Hyblaeidae described by Achille Guenée in 1852.

References

Hyblaeidae